Black Gunn is a 1972 American neo-noir crime thriller film, directed by Robert Hartford-Davis and starring Jim Brown, Martin Landau,  Brenda Sykes, Herbert Jefferson Jr. and Luciana Paluzzi. Baseball pitcher Vida Blue appears in a supporting role, as does former football player-turned-actor Bernie Casey.

The film is considered an entry blaxploitation sub-genre, but is unique to the genre in several different ways. Unlike many other blaxploitation films, it was an international co-production by a major studio (Columbia Pictures), produced by non-American filmmakers (director Hartford-Davis and producers Heyman and Priggen were all British) and featuring already-established stars like Landau and Paluzzi. It was Hartford-Davis’ penultimate film before his death in 1977.

Plot 
In Los Angeles, a nighttime robbery of an illegal mafia bookmaking operation is carried out by the militant African-American organization BAG (Black Action Group). Though successful, several of the bookmakers and one of the burglars are killed. The mastermind behind the robbery, a Vietnam veteran named Scott, is the brother of a prominent nightclub owner, Gunn. Seeking safe haven, Scott hides out at his brother's mansion after a brief reunion.

Meanwhile, mafia caporegime and used-car dealer Russ Capelli (Martin Landau) meets with a female West Coast crime boss, Toni Lombardo, to report the theft of daily payoff records and monies. Though Capelli receives an unrelated promotion for years of loyal service, he nonetheless fears the consequences of a loss of face and status as well as incriminating mob financial information. He therefore orders his men, led by psychotic assassin Ray Kriley, to shake down anyone who might have a connection to the robbery and to recover the lost goods using any means necessary.

Cast

Release 
The film was released theatrically in the United States by Columbia Pictures in December 1972.

The film was given a VHS release by Goodtimes Home Video in the United States.  It was later released on DVD in 2004 via Sony Pictures Home Entertainment.  This release is anamorphic in 1.85:1 aspect ratio.

See also
 List of American films of 1972
 List of British films of 1972

References

External links

 

Blaxploitation films
1972 films
American heist films
American neo-noir films
1970s crime thriller films
American crime thriller films
British heist films
British neo-noir films
British crime thriller films
1970s English-language films
African-American films
Columbia Pictures films
1970s American films
1970s British films